Crosses may refer to:

 Cross, the symbol

Geography
 Crosses, Cher, a French municipality
 Crosses, Arkansas, a small community located in the Ozarks of north west Arkansas

Language
 Crosses, a truce term used in East Anglia and Lincolnshire

Music
 Crosses (band), a musical project featuring members of Deftones and Far
 Crosses (Crosses album)
 Crosses (EP), by Jose Gonzalez
 Crosses (Zornik album), the fourth album by the Belgian rock band Zornik
 "Crosses", a track on the José González album Veneer

See also 
Cross (disambiguation)
Crosse